Stanislav Ianevski (born Stanislav Rumenov Yanevski, ; on 16 May 1985), is a Bulgarian actor best known for playing Viktor Krum in the 2005 fantasy film Harry Potter and the Goblet of Fire.

Ianevski was born in Sofia. He lived in England for five years, as well as in Israel.  While attending Mill Hill School in the United Kingdom with fellow Harry Potter actor Harry Melling, Ianevski had no particular acting aspirations and was not a drama student. He had only auditioned for Harry Potter and the Goblet of Fire after being spotted by Fiona Weir, a casting director who prompted him to attend an acting workshop, which resulted in his casting as Viktor Krum, a Bulgarian character in the Harry Potter series.  He was selected from 650 others, most of whom had auditioned in Sofia. He also starred in Hostel: Part II, the sequel to Eli Roth's film Hostel.

Film

Television

References

External links

 

1985 births
Bulgarian male film actors
Living people
People educated at Mill Hill School
Male actors from Sofia
Bulgarian expatriates in the United Kingdom
21st-century Bulgarian male actors
Bulgarian male television actors
Bulgarian emigrants to England